Drosera subhirtella, the sunny rainbow, is a scrambling or climbing perennial tuberous species in the carnivorous plant genus Drosera. It is endemic to Western Australia and is found in sandplains, granite outcrops, and swamp margins in sand, clay, and loam soils. Yellow flowers bloom from August to October.

Drosera subhirtella was first described by Jules Émile Planchon in 1848. A new variety of D. subhirtella, var. moorei, was described by Ludwig Diels in his 1906 monograph on the Droseraceae. In 1982, N. G. Marchant changed the variety to a subspecies and there the taxon stood until Allen Lowrie elevated it to species rank at D. moorei in 1999.

See also
List of Drosera species

References

Carnivorous plants of Australia
Caryophyllales of Australia
Eudicots of Western Australia
Plants described in 1848
subhirtella